The Rural Municipality of Wallace No. 243 is a rural municipality (RM) in the Canadian province of Saskatchewan within Census Division No. 9 and  Division No. 4. It is located in the east-central portion of the province.

History 
The RM of Wallace No. 243 incorporated as a rural municipality on December 11, 1911.

Geography

Communities and localities 
The following urban municipalities are surrounded by the RM.

Villages
 Rhein

The following unincorporated communities are within the RM.

Special service areas
 Stornoway

Localities
 Barvas
 Calley
 Chrysler
 Dunleath
 Kessock
 Rokeby
 Tonkin

Demographics 

Government 
The RM of Wallace No. 243 is governed by an elected municipal council and an appointed administrator that meets on the second Friday of every month. The reeve of the RM is Garry Liebrecht while its administrator is Gerry Burym. The RM's office is located in Yorkton.

References 

Wallace

Division No. 9, Saskatchewan